Tachikara is a Japanese sports ball brand. It was established in Tokyo in 1915 by Toyaburo Iimuro.

References

External links 
 

Sporting goods manufacturers of Japan